Edward Colston (2 November 1636 – 11 October 1721) was an English merchant, slave trader, philanthropist, and Tory Member of Parliament.

Colston followed his father in the family business becoming a sea merchant, initially trading in wine, fruits and textiles, mainly in Spain, Portugal and other European ports. By 1680, he became involved in the slave trade as a senior executive of the Royal African Company, which held a monopoly on the English trade in African slaves. He was deputy governor of the company in 1689–90.

Colston supported and endowed schools and other public institutions in Bristol, London and elsewhere. His name was widely commemorated in Bristol landmarks, and a statue of him was erected in 1895. 

With growing awareness in the late 20th century of his involvement in Britain's slave trade, there were protests and petitions for name changes, culminating in June 2020, when the statue was toppled and pushed into Bristol Harbour during protests in support of Black Lives Matter. The city's concert venue, Colston Hall  was renamed Bristol Beacon along with several other locations that held his name.

Early life
Colston was born on 2 November 1636 in Temple Street, Bristol, and baptised in the Temple Church, Bristol. His parents were William Colston (1608–1681), a prosperous Royalist merchant who was High Sheriff of Bristol in 1643, and his wife Sarah Batten (d. 1701), daughter of Edward Batten; he was the eldest of at least 11 and possibly as many as 15 children. The Colston family had lived in the city since the late 13th century. Colston was brought up in Bristol until the time of the English Civil War, when he probably lived for a while on his father's estate in Winterbourne, just north of the city. The family then moved to London, and Colston was educated at the Christ's Hospital school. The English Civil War shaped Colston's lifelong support for order and stability in the form of monarchy and High Anglicanism.

Career
In 1654, Colston was apprenticed to the Mercers Company for eight years, and in 1673 he was enrolled into it. By 1672, he had become a merchant in London. Like his father, Colston exported in textiles from London while importing oils, wine and sherry from Spain and Portugal. He also traded silk with Virginia and was a regular trader of Newfoundland cod to Naples. He had built up a successful business trading with Spain, Portugal, Italy and Africa.

In 1680, Colston became a member of the Royal African Company, which had held the monopoly in England on trading along the west coast of Africa in gold, silver, ivory and slaves from 1662. Colston was deputy governor of the company from 1689 to 1690. His association with the company ended in 1692. The company was established by King Charles II, together with his brother the Duke of York (later King James II) as the governor of the company, City of London merchants and other investors.

During Colston's involvement with the Royal African Company from 1680 to 1692, it is estimated that the company transported over 84,000 African men, women and children to the Caribbean and the rest of the Americas, of whom as many as 19,000 may have died on the journey. The slaves were sold for labour on tobacco, and (increasingly) sugar plantations.

In 1681 he probably began to take an active interest in the affairs of Bristol, where about this time he embarked in a sugar refinery.
In 1682, he made a loan of £1,800 to the Bristol Corporation and the following year, became a member of the Society of Merchant Venturers. By 1685 he appears as the city's creditor for about £2,000.

Although a Tory High Churchman and often in conflict with the Whig corporation of Bristol, Colston transferred a large segment of his original shareholding to William III at the beginning of 1689, securing the new regime's favour for the African Company. The value of Colston's shares increased and being without heirs he began to donate large sums to charities (see below).

Colston used his money and power to promote order in the form of High Anglicanism in the Church of England and oppose Anglican Latitudinarians, Roman Catholics, and dissenter Protestants. He withdrew from the African Company in 1692, but continued working on his private businesses until he retired in 1708. Colston was then an MP for Bristol from 1710 to 1713.

Death

Colston died on 11 October 1721, aged 84, at his home, (old) Cromwell House (demolished 1857), in Mortlake, south west London, where he had lived since about 1689. His will stated that he wished to be buried simply without pomp, but this instruction was ignored. His body was carried to Bristol and was buried at All Saints' Church. His monument was designed by James Gibbs with an effigy carved by John Michael Rysbrack.

Colston never married, and settled a "considerable fortune in land" on his nephew Edward Colston (MP for Wells), when Edward married in 1704.

Philanthropic works

Colston supported and endowed schools, houses for the poor, almshouses, hospitals and Anglican churches in Bristol, London and elsewhere. His name features widely on Bristol buildings and landmarks.

In 1681, the date of his father's death, he appears as a governor of Christ's Hospital, to which he afterwards gave frequently. During the remainder of his life he seems to have divided his attention pretty equally between the city of his birth and that of his adoption.

In 1691, on St Michael's Hill, Bristol, at a cost of £8,000, he founded Colstons Almshouses for the reception of 24 poor men and women, and endowed with accommodation for "Six Saylors", at a cost of £600, the merchant's almshouses in King Street. He also endowed Queen Elizabeth's Hospital school. In 1696, at a cost of £8,000, he endowed a foundation for clothing and teaching 40 boys (the books employed were to have in them "no tincture of Whiggism"); and six years afterwards he expended a further sum of £1,500 in rebuilding the schoolhouse. In 1708, at a cost of £41,200, he built and endowed his great foundation on Saint Augustine’s Back, for the instruction, clothing, maintaining and apprenticing of 100 boys; and in time of scarcity, during this and next year, he transmitted some £20,000 to the London committee,
to be managed by the Society of Merchant Venturers for its upkeep. He gave money to schools in Temple (one of which went on to become St Mary Redcliffe and Temple School) and other parts of Bristol, and to several churches and the cathedral.

The Colston Society, which had operated for 275 years commemorating Colston, latterly as a charity, decided to disband in 2020.

Memorials

Buildings in Bristol formerly named in memory of Colston included the Colston Tower and Colston Hall (now Beacon Tower and Bristol Beacon, respectively). Colston Avenue and Colston Street are named after him, as is a regional bread bun, the Colston bun. A statue of Colston is on the exterior of Bristol Guildhall, built 1843–46. There was an 1870 stained-glass window of the Good Samaritan by Clayton and Bell dedicated to Colston's memory in the north transept of St Mary Redcliffe, which was removed in June 2020, following the toppling of his outdoor statue.  The largest window in Bristol Cathedral is also dedicated to Colston's memory; the Bishop of Bristol announced in June 2020 that the Anglican Diocese of Bristol would remove prominent references to Colston from the window.

City-centre memorial statue
In 1895, 174 years after Colston's death, a statue designed by John Cassidy was erected in the centre of Bristol, to commemorate Colston's philanthropy. Colston's slave-trading activities were subsequently uncovered in a biography of his life and work written by H.J. Wilkins in 1920, and from the 1990s onwards, there were growing calls for the statue to be marked with a plaque stating that he was a slave trader, or taken down.
In July 2018, Bristol City Council, which was responsible for the statue, made a planning application to add a second plaque which would "add to the public knowledge about Colston" including his philanthropy and his involvement in slave trading, though the initial wording suggested came in for significant criticism from members of the public and a Bristol Conservative councillor, with the result being that the plaque was reworded. This wording was edited by a former curator at the Bristol Museum and Art Gallery, creating a third proposal which was backed by other members of the public, though it was criticised by the academic behind the first two versions, who claimed it "sanitised" history, minimising Colston's role, omitting the number of child slaves, and focussing on West Africans as the original enslavers. Nevertheless, a wording was subsequently agreed upon and the bronze plaque was cast. After the plaque was physically produced, its installation was vetoed in March 2019 by the Mayor of Bristol, Marvin Rees, who criticised the Society of Merchant Venturers for the rewording. A statement from the mayor's office called it "unacceptable", claimed that Rees had not been consulted, and promised to continue work on a second plaque.

On 7 June 2020, the statue was toppled and pushed into Bristol Harbour by demonstrators during the George Floyd protests. The statue was retrieved from the harbour four days later by Bristol City Council, and taken to a secure location.  After the statue was toppled, the Merchant Venturers said that it had been "inappropriate" for them to have become involved in the rewording of the plaque in 2018, and that the removal of the statue was "right for Bristol".

From 4 June 2021, the statue was put on display in its damaged condition by Bristol's M Shed museum, which stated "this temporary display is the start of a conversation, not a complete exhibition".

Modern reappraisal
In the biography of Colston written by H.J. Wilkins in 1920, the author commented that "we cannot picture him justly except against his historical background". Colston's involvement in the slave trade predated the abolition movement in Britain, and was during the time when "slavery was generally condoned in England—indeed, throughout Europe—by churchmen, intellectuals and the educated classes".

Since at least the 1990s, with increasing recognition of Colston's role in the slave trade, there has been growing criticism of his commemoration. The Dolphin Society, which was formed to continue Colston's philanthropy, as of 2015 referred to "the evils of slavery" and recognised that "black citizens in Bristol today can suffer disadvantage in terms of education, employment and housing for reasons that connect back to the days of the trans-Atlantic slave trade".

The proportion of Colston's wealth that came from his involvement in the slave trade and slave-produced sugar is unknown, and can only be the subject of conjecture. He also made money from trading in commodities and interest from money lending.

In April 2017, the charity that runs the venue known at the time as "Colston Hall", the Bristol Music Trust, announced that it would drop the name of Colston when it reopened after refurbishment in 2020. There had been protests and petitions calling for a name change and some concertgoers and artists had boycotted the venue because of the Colston name. Following the decision, petitions to retain the name of Colston reached almost 10,000 signatures, though the charity confirmed that the name change would go ahead. The hall was renamed as the Bristol Beacon in September 2020, after three years of consultation.

In November 2017, the then Colston's Girls' School, funded by the Society of Merchant Venturers, announced that it would not drop the name of Colston, because it was of "no benefit" to the school to do so. Later consultations in 2020 with staff and pupils resulted in the school changing its name to Montpelier High School. 

In summer 2018, Colston Primary School renamed itself Cotham Gardens Primary School after consultation with pupils and parents. 

In February 2019, St Mary Redcliffe and Temple School announced that it would rename its former Colston school house after the American mathematician Katherine Johnson. 

In June 2020, the pub formerly known as the Colston Arms temporarily changed its name  to Ye Olde Pubby Mcdrunkface (a reference to the name chosen by the public during a poll to name a new research vessel in 2016), inviting suggestions from the public for a new name. In December 2021, the pub was renamed the Open Arms.

In April 2018, the Lord Mayor of Bristol ordered that a portrait of Colston be removed from her office, saying that she would not "be comfortable sharing it with the portrait". She said that it is planned that the portrait will be hung in the proposed Museum of Abolition in the city at a future date.

In 2020, at the sight of the toppling of the Edward Colston statue in Bristol, a member of the organisational team for the event "was adamant that Colston’s charitable deeds in no way made up for the transportation of thousands of Africans into slavery. 'The statue was glorifying the acts of a slave trader. He gave some money to schools and good causes but it was blood money', she said".

See also

References

1636 births
1721 deaths
17th-century English businesspeople
17th-century philanthropists
18th-century philanthropists
British MPs 1710–1713
Businesspeople from Bristol
English Anglicans
English philanthropists
English slave traders
Members of the Parliament of Great Britain for Bristol
Members of the Society of Merchant Venturers
Patrons of schools
People educated at Christ's Hospital
Tory MPs (pre-1834)